Vicky Lagos is a Spanish film and television actress. She is the daughter of the actress Mimí Muñoz and the actor and director Vittorio De Sica.

Selected filmography
 Let's Make the Impossible! (1958)
 Son of the Red Corsair (1959)
 The Song of the Nightingale (1959)
 The Big Show (1960)
 The Two Rivals (1960)
 The Wild Ones of San Gil Bridge (1966)
 The Cannibal Man (1972)

References

Bibliography 
 Peter Cowie & Derek Elley. World Filmography: 1967. Fairleigh Dickinson University Press, 1977.

External links 
 

1938 births
Living people
Spanish film actresses
People from Madrid